Ronald Ray Bryant (born October 18, 1975), better known by his stage name Baby Bash (formerly Baby Beesh), is an American rapper. From 1995 until 1998, as part of Dope House Records, after which he changed the last part of his stage name to "Bash." His first album Savage Dreams (2001), was followed by On Tha Cool (2002), and his first major label release: Tha Smokin' Nephew (2003). The album included the single "Suga Suga" (alongside Frankie J), which peaked at number 7 on the Billboard Hot 100. 

In 2005, Super Saucy was released, preceded by the lead single "Baby, I'm Back" (featuring Akon). Cyclone followed in 2007, with its title single (featuring T-Pain) and its follow-up, "What Is It" (featuring Sean Kingston), finding moderate success on the Billboard charts as well.

He contributed to other performers' works, including the song "Obsession (No Es Amor)" by the 3rd Wish, released in Europe and later a U.S release with a re-recording of the European version, performed by Frankie J in 2005 and "Doing Too Much" by Paula DeAnda in 2006.

He has collaborated with numerous other artists during his career, such as West Coast rappers  B-Legit, C-Bo, Coolio, E-40 and Mac Dre, R&B singers like Akon, Avant,  Natalie, Bohemia, Mario,  and Nate Dogg, and other Latino rappers such as Fat Joe, Nino B, Doll-E Girl, South Park Mexican, Frost, and Pitbull. He continues to write lyrics for singers such as Paula DeAnda, Jennifer Hudson and Frankie J.

Biography

Early life 
Bryant was born in Vallejo, California to a Mexican mother from Mendota, California. Bryant was raised by his grandmother, and Bryant's father and uncles exposed him to many different types of musical genres. Initially, Bryant wanted to be a professional basketball player. He planned to play basketball for the junior college he attended in California during the mid-1990s. An ankle injury prevented Bryant from pursuing basketball as a career.

2001–2002: Savage Dreams and On tha Cool 
Bryant's music career began as part of the group Potna Duece in Vallejo, California. He went to Houston in 1998, where he met fellow rapper South Park Mexican. Prior to his success as a solo artist he, under the name "Baby Beesh", was part of rap groups Potna Deuce and Latino Velvet.

Bash's debut album, Savage Dreams, was released on the independent label Dope House Records in 2001. The album features guest performances by South Park Mexican, Frost, Jay Tee, Mr. Kee, Don Cisco and Merciless.

On tha Cool is his second studio album, released June 11, 2002, on Dope House Records. It was produced by Happy P and Johnny Z. The album features guest performances by SPM, Jay Tee, Russell Lee, Don Cisco, Mr. Shadow and DJ Kane.

2003–2005: Tha Smokin' Nephew, Ménage à Trois and Super Saucey  

The acclaim he received caught the attention of Universal Records, who signed him later that year. In 2003, Baby Bash released his first album on a major label, Tha Smokin' Nephew. It debuted at number 48 on the Billboard 200. Five months after its release, the album was certified Gold by the RIAA. As of March 2005, the album has sold 531,000 copies in the United States. Ménage à Trois is an independent label album (fifth album overall) by Baby Bash.

In 2005, Bash released Super Saucy. Super Saucy is the first official studio album (sixth album overall) by Baby Bash released in March 2005. It spawned the hit single, "Baby I'm Back" (featuring Akon) which reached number 19 on the Billboard Hot 100. It is also his last release on Universal Records before signing with Arista Records. The album debuted at number 11 on the Billboard 200 with 48,000 copies sold in the first week released, becoming Baby Bash's highest-charting album to date.

2006–2011: Cyclone and Bashtown 
He was featured on Paula DeAnda's first single "Doin' Too Much", from her debut album Paula DeAnda. His third studio album, Cyclone (initially titled Ronnie Rey All Day), was released in late October 2007. So far, Bryant has released three singles from the album: "Mamacita", featuring Marcos Hernandez, "Na Na", and "Cyclone", featuring Mickaël & T-Pain. During the month of the album's release, Baby Bash became Myspace's #1 Latin artist, and the single "Cyclone" sold over 750,000 digital copies and ringtones prior to the album's release.

Bryant completed a film entitled Primos, starring Chingo Bling and Danny Trejo. The comedy involves three cousins working in a bakery with dreams of making money and was released in 2010. His major-label debut, Tha Smokin' Nephew, was well received by AllMusic, but his 2007 album, Cyclone, was given mixed reviews, including a negative review by Rolling Stone magazine.

Bashtown is the fourth studio album by Bryant. Released on March 22, 2011, it is the first album to be released on Upstairs Records. Bashtown features production from Jim Jonsin, Printz Board, Happy P, Mickaël, J. Lacy, and C-Ballin, and features vocal guests E-40, Paul Wall, Slim Thug, and Lloyd, among others. According to Bryant, the album was recorded in 2010.

In December 2010, Bryant was offered a job as an on-air personality for Wild 94.9, a Rhythmic Contemporary commercial radio station in San Francisco, California. In the same month, Bryant announced that he would be endorsing a new energy drink for women named after his 2011 single "Go Girl". Part of the sales proceeds from the energy drink will be donated to various charities for breast cancer- and ovarian cancer-research for women.

2011–present: Unsung and arrest 
Bryant was arrested with Paul Wall on the night of September 10, 2011, in El Paso, Texas, for possession of marijuana.  Both rappers were released the same night on US$300 bail.

Bryant has a son named Brando Rey.

On December 17, 2013, Bryant released his eighth studio album, Unsung. The album features artists such as Too Short, Miguel, and Problem. Production credits of the album belong to DJ Rex, Happy Perez, Mickaël, J. Lacy, and C-Ballin.

Discography

Studio albums
Savage Dreams (2001)
On Tha Cool (2002)
Tha Smokin' Nephew (2003)
Super Saucy (2005)
Cyclone (2007)
Bashtown (2011)
Unsung (2013)
Ronnie Rey All Day (2014)
Don't Panic, It's Organic (2016)

Collaboration albums
Welcome to Da Tilt with Potna Deuce (1994)
Latino Velvet Project with Latino Velvet (1997)
Velvet City with Latino Velvet (2000)
Wanted with Lone Star Ridaz (2001)
Velvetism with Jay Tee (2002)
M.S.U. with Jay Tee (2012)
Playamade Mexicanz with Lucky Luciano (2012)
The Legalizers: Legalize or Die, Vol. 1 with Paul Wall (2016)
Sangria with Frankie J (2017)

Films
Pain (2010)
Filly Brown (2013)
Vengeance

References 

1969 births
Living people
Hispanic and Latino American rappers
American rappers of Mexican descent
Musicians from Vallejo, California
Rappers from Houston
RCA Records artists
Gangsta rappers
Universal Records artists
Southern hip hop musicians
20th-century American rappers
21st-century American rappers
Hardcore hip hop artists